Adorée Via (Viola) Villany was the stage name for a dancer and choreographer.

Biography
Ambiguity surrounds Villany's birthplace and name. She was reported at various times to be French (born in Rouen), Hungarian (“The Pearl of the Puszta”), or a German Jew (born in Danzig as Erna Reich). She appears to have spent most of her career in Germany, and last appears in the German press in 1927. The Grazer Volksblatt newspaper in 1911 states she began performing in the Berlin Überbrettl cabaret (perhaps in 1902) as “[an Isadora] Duncan imitator.”

Other sources state she came public notice in 1905, performing the Dance of the Seven Veils while simultaneously speaking the final monologue from Oscar Wilde's play Salome. Her works explored mythical, historical and Oriental themes, as well as sometimes possessing abstract qualities. Villany also incorporated themes from paintings by contemporary artists such as Franz Stuck and Arnold Böcklin. She designed her own costumes, which were often very revealing, and uncovered her body during her performances. Villany performed in Prague, Paris, Ghent, Berlin, Rotterdam, Vienna and Brussels and at spas such as Marienbad and San Sebastián.

She was prosecuted for appearing unclothed on stage in Munich in 1911 but was acquitted; the jury found that her performance was in the "higher interests of art". In 1913, she was fined 200 francs by the Tribunal correctionnel in Paris for indecent exposure.

Villany published a book on dance, Tanz-Reform und Pseudo-Moral Kritischsatyrische Gedanken aus meinem Bühnen- u. Privatleben, in 1912 that expressed her aesthetic principles.

She appeared in the 1906 German film Tanz der Salome by Otto Messter and the 1915 Danish film  by Rino Lupo.

References

External links 
 

Year of death missing
Dance writers
20th-century French dancers
20th-century German dancers
20th-century women writers
Year of birth missing
Silent film actresses